The Chicago Blackhawks name and logo controversy refers to the controversy surrounding the name and logo of the Chicago Blackhawks, a National Hockey League (NHL) ice hockey team based in Chicago, Illinois. The use of terms and images referring to Native Americans/First Nations as the name or mascot for a sports team without permissions from or consultations with local Indigenous communities, is a topic of public controversy in the United States and Canada. Since the 1960s, as part of the indigenous civil rights movements, there have been a number of protests and other actions by Native Americans and their supporters targeting the more prominent use of such names and images by professional franchises such as the Cleveland Guardians formerly known as the "Indians" of Major League Baseball (MLB) (in particular their "Chief Wahoo" logo) that was officially discontinued in 2016; the Washington Commanders formerly known as the "Redskins" of the National Football League (NFL), the NFL's Kansas City Chiefs and MLB's Atlanta Braves, the latter two attracting criticism of "the tomahawk chop" often performed by their fans. Like other teams with tribal mascots, there are calls from Indigenous activists and organizations to change the Blackhawks' name and logo and eliminate tribal mascots and imagery throughout sports. In contrast to generic names used by other teams, Blackhawks refers to a World War I-era U.S. Army division which was named for prominent Illinois-based Native American chief Black Hawk.

Professional organizations representing psychologists, sociologists, school counselors, anthropologists, and educators have published resolutions opposing the use of Native American mascots as harmful and discriminatory. Psychologist Stephanie Fryberg argues that sports mascots and images, rather than being mere entertainment, are important symbols with deeper psychological and social effects. Stereotyping may directly affect the academic performance and self-esteem of Native American youth, whose people face high rates of suicide, unemployment, and poverty. Euro-Americans exposed to mascots may be more likely to believe not only that such stereotypes are true, but that Native Americans have no identity beyond these stereotypes. Research demonstrates the harm of stereotyping, with studies showing that exposure to any stereotypes increased the likelihood of stereotypical thinking with regard to other groups.

The National Congress of American Indians, The American Indian Center of Chicago, The Chi-Nations Youth Council and over 1,500 Native organizations and advocates from over 150 federally recognized tribes across the country, including members of the Sac and Fox Nation, support changing the team name and logo.
Members of Black Hawk's family have spoken out opposing the use of Black Hawk as a mascot and caricature logo. 
Since July 2020, headdresses have been banned from being worn at Blackhawk home games. The team has stated that they believe that both the name and logo symbolize the importance of Black Hawk's legacy.

History
The National Hockey League (NHL)'s Chicago Blackhawks was named in honor of the U.S. 86th Infantry Division, which was nicknamed the "Blackhawk Division" after Black Hawk, a Native American chief who was based in present-day Illinois; the team's founder, Frederic McLaughlin, having served in that division.

Black Hawk was a leader of the Sauk who sided with the British in the War of 1812 and later attempted to regain tribal land in the Black Hawk War of 1832. Opponents of the logo say that adoption of his name for the 86th Infantry, the hockey team, and later for the Blackhawk helicopter are an example of designating certain Native Americans as "worthy adversaries."

Controversy

Suzan Shown Harjo (Cheyenne and Hodulgee Muscogee), who was awarded the US Presidential Medal of Freedom for decades of American Indian advocacy and is President of the Morning Star Institute, says the Blackhawks have escaped the scrutiny given to other teams using Native imagery because hockey is not a cultural force on the level of football. American Indian organizations have called for an end to all Indian-related mascots and that she found the hockey team's name and Indian head symbol to be offensive. "It lacks dignity," she said. "There's dignity in a school being named after a person or a people. There's dignity in a health clinic or hospital. There's nothing dignified in something being so named (that is used for) recreation or entertainment or fun." The National Congress of American Indians also opposes the Blackhawks' logo, as it does all Native American mascots. In 2010, sports columnist Damien Cox called on the franchise to retire the "racially insensitive" logo, saying that: "Clearly, no right-thinking person would name a team after an aboriginal figure these days any more than they would use Muslims or Africans or Chinese or any ethnic group to depict a specific sporting notion."

In 2015, Mark Chipman, chairman of True North Sports & Entertainment, the owner of the NHL's Winnipeg Jets decided to ban fake Native headdresses at games after meeting with First Nations leaders. The meeting took place in response to a complaint by a Jets fan after seeing a Blackhawks fan in a headdress.

Addressing the controversy
The Blackhawks have worked with the American Indian Center (AIC) to help inform their community and fan base by sharing Native American culture and history. Scott Sypolt, Executive Counsel for the American Indian Center weighed in on the logo and name controversy by stating, "There is a consensus among us that there's a huge distinction between a sports team called the Redskins depicting native people as red, screaming, ignorant savages and a group like the Blackhawks honoring Black Hawk, a true Illinois historical figure."

However, this stance is markedly different from the one previously taken by the American Indian Center, with the shift coming only in the past few years. In 2010, for instance, Joe Podlasek stated that, "The stance is very clear. We want the Chicago Blackhawks logo to change. For us, that's one of our grandfathers. Would you do that with your grandfather's picture? Take it and throw it on a rug? Walk on it and dance on it?" John Blackhawk, Chairman of the Winnebago Tribe of Nebraska, has suggested that the change in position for the AIC may be connected to contributions the Blackhawks organization has recently begun making to the center: "We all do contributions, but we don't do it for the sake of wanting to be forgiven for something we've done that's offensive."

In 2019, the American Indian Center of Chicago ended all ties to the Chicago Blackhawks Foundation, stating they will no longer affiliate "with organizations that perpetuate stereotypes through the use of 'Indian' mascots." The AIC noted in its statement that they "previously held a relationship with the Chicago Blackhawks Foundation with the intention of educating the general public about American Indians and the use of logos and mascots. The AIC, along with members of the community have since decided to end this relationship" and stated that "going forward, AIC will have no professional ties with the Blackhawks, or any other organization that perpetuates harmful stereotypes."

After the Washington Redskins announced that they would be changing their name in July 2020, the Blackhawks confirmed that they would continue to use their team name. However, the team did agree to ban Native American headdresses at home games held in the United Center in recognition of being sacred symbols. Before the ban was enacted, there had in fact been incidents where some Blackhawk fans wore headdresses. After the Cleveland Indians announced in December 2020 that the team would change their name after the 2021 season, new CEO Danny Wirtz reiterated that the Blackhawks would not change.

The Chi-Nations Youth Council (CNYC), an Indigenous youth organization in Chicago, said in 2020, "The Chicago Blackhawks name and logo symbolizes a legacy of imperialism and genocide." "As statues of invaders, slave holders, and white supremacists fall across the nation so too should the images and language of the savage and dead 'Indians'." CNYC also noted "As social consciousness has grown over the past decades so has the Blackhawks performative gestures of buying their reprieve from those willing to sell out the health and humanity of our future generations."

Despite this opposition, as of 2022, the Blackhawks have stated their intent to keep the name and imagery, along with their belief that they "honor and celebrate legacy of Black Hawk" and that the name and logo "symbolizes this important and historic person." Their website states that they are working on "educating our staff, fans and local community on the history of Black Hawk and original peoples of Illinois, as well as on Native American contributions to today's society." The website also lists several Native American groups and individuals they donate money to, or hire to do artwork, and posts stories about various Native Americans who are considered members of the "Blackhawks community."

References

Chicago Blackhawks
National Hockey League team mascots
Anti-indigenous racism in the United States
Native American-related controversies